The 2021 Grand Est Open 88 was a professional women's tennis tournament played on outdoor clay courts. It was the fourteenth edition of the tournament which was part of the 2021 ITF Women's World Tennis Tour. It took place in Contrexéville, France between 5 and 11 July 2021.

Singles main-draw entrants

Seeds

 1 Rankings are as of 28 June 2021.

Other entrants
The following players received wildcards into the singles main draw:
  Loïs Boisson
  Elsa Jacquemot
  Marine Partaud
  Lucie Wargnier

The following player received entry using a protected ranking:
  Yuan Yue

The following players received entry from the qualifying draw:
  Kamilla Bartone
  Émeline Dartron
  Weronika Falkowska
  Léolia Jeanjean
  Lena Papadakis
  Margaux Rouvroy
  Oksana Selekhmeteva
  Valeriya Strakhova

Champions

Singles

 Anhelina Kalinina def.  Dalma Gálfi, 6–2, 6–2

Doubles

  Anna Danilina /  Ulrikke Eikeri def.  Dalma Gálfi /  Kimberley Zimmermann, 6–0, 1–6, [10–4]

References

External links
 2021 Grand Est Open 88 at ITFtennis.com
 Official website

2021 ITF Women's World Tennis Tour
2021 in French tennis
July 2021 sports events in France
Grand Est Open 88